"Weird Al" Yankovic: The Ultimate Video Collection is a DVD by "Weird Al" Yankovic which features all 24 music videos Yankovic created up to the release of the DVD. Also included are bonus features including on-screen lyrics, a photo gallery, 5.1 surround sound, and three bonus video clips.

The DVD has been classified for platinum sales in The United States.

Music videos

All videos are the original, except for "Spy Hard" – the credits that originally appeared during the opening of the film were removed for copyright reasons; only the title and Al's theme music credit remain.

Bonus clips
 The Weird Al Show: Includes the opening plus "Lousy Haircut", "Livin' in the Fridge", and "Lasagna" videos shown during the series run.
 The Tomorrow Show: Full segment from April 21, 1981, with Al singing "Another One Rides The Bus".
 "My Bologna": An Easter egg accessed by selecting The Weird Al Show on the Extras page and pressing up.
Note: None of these Bonus Clips are present in the Australian version of this DVD.

Certifications

References

External links
 

"Weird Al" Yankovic video albums
2003 video albums
Music video compilation albums
2003 compilation albums
Volcano Entertainment video albums
Volcano Entertainment compilation albums
"Weird Al" Yankovic compilation albums
2000s English-language films